Tyler Jayden Frost (born 7 June 1999) is an English professional footballer who plays as a midfielder for Aldershot Town. Frost started his career at Reading and had a loan spell at Havant & Waterlooville before playing for Crawley Town and Harrogate Town.

Early life and education
Born in Reading, Frost attended The Forest School in Winnersh.

Career
Frost started his career at Reading, joining the club's youth academy in 2014 at the age of 15, before signing his first professional contract with the club in 2017. In December 2018, Frost joined National League side Havant & Waterlooville on loan, scoring on his debut in a 1–1 draw against Hartlepool United on 22 December 2020. He made 7 league appearances in total for the club, scoring once. At the end of the 2018–19 season, he signed a new contract at Reading. In February 2020, he had a trial period at Sunderland, but did not sign for the club, before being released by Reading in July 2020 upon the expiry of his contract.

On 1 August 2020, Frost signed for League Two side Crawley Town on a two-year contract. He made his debut for Crawley on 5 September 2020 in a 3–1 EFL Cup defeat to Millwall, and scored his first goal for them on 17 October 2020 in a 4–0 victory over Morecambe. Frost was released at the end of the 2021–22 season.

Following a trial spell at the club, Frost signed for League Two club Harrogate Town on a six-month deal in July 2022. He left the club in January 2023, and signed for Aldershot Town in February 2023.

Style of play
Frost generally plays as a right midfielder, but can also play as a central midfielder or left midfielder.

Career statistics

References

1999 births
Living people
English footballers
Sportspeople from Reading, Berkshire
Reading F.C. players
Havant & Waterlooville F.C. players
Crawley Town F.C. players
Harrogate Town A.F.C. players
Aldershot Town F.C. players
Association football midfielders
English Football League players
National League (English football) players
Footballers from Berkshire